Holland McTyeire Thompson (July 30, 1873 – October 21, 1940), was an American historian who wrote about the New South.

Early life
Thompson was born in Randolph County, North Carolina. He graduated from the University of North Carolina.

Career
Thompson served as a high school principal at Concord High School in Concord, North Carolina from 1895–99, where he wrote an essay about the transformation of southern culture from a rural agricultural to textile/manufacturing way of life that he witnessed while an educator in Concord. This essay, in part, gained Thompson admittance to Columbia University where he received his Ph.D. in 1901, and became a full professor of history at City College of New York.

Thompson, while professor at CCNY, was among the leading scholar/historians of the social and industrial transformation of the New South in the early decades of the 20th century.

Personal life and death
Thompson married Isobel Graham Aitken of New York in 1905. They had one son, Lawrence.

Thompson died on October 21, 1940.

Works 
 From the Cotton Field to the Cotton Mill: A Study of the Industrial Transition in North Carolina (1906). New York: Macmillan. 
 The New South: A Chronicle of Social and Industrial Evolution Yale Chronicles of America Series (1919). New Haven: Yale University Press. 
 The Book of History: The World's Greatest War, From the Outbreak of the War to the Treaty of Versailles (1920-1921). New York: Grolier Society. 
 The Age of Invention: A Chronicle of Mechanical Conquest (1921). New Haven: Yale University Press. 
 Canada--Newfoundland--Canadian Parks (1940). New York: Grolier Society. 
 England--Wales (1940). New York: Grolier Society. 
 North and South Poles: Eskimos, Indians (1940). New York: Grolier Society. 
 Scandinavia--Finland--Iceland (1940). New York: Grolier Society. 
 South America (1940). New York: Grolier Society.

References

External links
 
 

1873 births
1940 deaths
American historians
People from Randolph County, North Carolina
University of North Carolina at Chapel Hill alumni
Columbia University alumni
City College of New York faculty
Historians of the Southern United States